The chengila, or cennala, is an Indian gong which helps the traditional singer or dancer keep time.

Context and Playing Technique
The chengila is a percussion instrument that maintains a steady beat and provides musical background. The thick bell metal disc, which hangs by a strap looped around one wrist, is struck by a short wand held in the other hand. A ringing sound is produced when the chengila is struck when hanging freely; a flat tone is produced when it is struck while held against the forearm.

Cultural Importance
In Kerala, a state in south-west India, the chengila is used in many different traditional art forms  including Chemmanakali, Kathakali, and Krishnanattam.

References 

Indian musical instruments
Asian percussion instruments
Idiophones